Several ships of the Swedish Navy have been named HSwMS Loke, named after Loki in Norse mythology:

  was a  launched in 1869 and decommissioned in 1908
  was an auxiliary ship launched in 1944 and sold in 1992
  is an auxiliary ship launched in 1994

Swedish Navy ship names